The following is a list of regular season and tournament champions of the Big South Conference in men's basketball. The Big South has held a tournament every year since 1986, with the winner receiving an automatic bid to the NCAA tournament.

Champions by year

Divisional Format
Beginning in the 2012–13 season, the Big South split up into two divisions of six teams each following the addition of Longwood to the conference in July 2012.

Tournament championships by school

Current members

Former members

References

 
Champions